The 29th Stockholm International Film Festival took place on 7–18 November 2018 in Stockholm, Sweden.

Canadian drama film Firecrackers won the Bronze Horse, most prestigious award.

Official selections

Competition

American Independents

Discovery

Documentary Competition

Icons

Impact

Open Zone

Awards
The following awards were presented during the 29th edition:
Best Film (Bronze Horse): Firecrackers by Jasmin Mozaffari
Best Director: Eva Trobisch for All Good
Best Debut: Skate Kitchen by Crystal Moselle
Best Script: Capernaum by Nadine Labaki, Jihad Hojeily, Michelle Kesrouani, Georges Khabbaz, and Khaled Mouzanar
Best Actress: Michaela Kurimsky for Firecrackers
Best Actor: Victor Polster for Girl
Best Cinematography: Hiroshi Okayama for Jesus
Best Documentary: Putin's Witnesses by Vitaly Mansky
Best Short Film: Judgement by Raymund Ribay Gutierrez
FIPRESCI Award: Cold War by Paweł Pawlikowski
Rising Star: Alba August
Impact Award: Beatriz Seigner for Los Silencios
Audience Award: Capernaum by Nadine Labaki

Lifetime Achievement Award
Mary Harron

Achievement Award
Gunnel Lindblom

Visionary Award
Asghar Farhadi

References

External links
Official website

2018 film festivals
2018 in Swedish cinema
2010s in Stockholm
2018